Bilal Nichols (born September 14, 1996) is an American football defensive tackle for the Las Vegas Raiders of the National Football League (NFL). He was drafted by the Bears in the fifth round of the 2018 NFL Draft. He played college football at Delaware.

College career
He had 56 tackles including 6.5 for loss, 5.5 sacks, an interception, four pass break-ups, and a blocked kick in 2017. He was named first-team All-Colonial Athletic Association for his season.

Professional career

Chicago Bears
Nichols was drafted by the Chicago Bears in the fifth round (145th overall) of the 2018 NFL Draft. Like Nichols, Bears head coach Matt Nagy was a Delaware alumnus, while assistant Brian Ginn worked for the school before joining the Bears.

His first NFL start came in Week 10 of the 2018 season against the Detroit Lions, where he recorded his first full sack on quarterback Matthew Stafford in a 34–22 win. A second sack came in the season finale on the Minnesota Vikings' Kirk Cousins as the Bears won 24–10.

Nichols' 2019 season was marred by a broken hand that he suffered in Week 2 against the Denver Broncos. Upon his return, he primarily filled in for the injured Akiem Hicks at tackle. In the final game of the year against Minnesota, he recovered a fumble by Mike Boone on the Vikings' opening drive.

After nose tackle Eddie Goldman opted out of the 2020 season for COVID-19 reasons, Nichols took over his slot. In the Bears' Week 6 game against the Carolina Panthers, Nichols sacked Teddy Bridgewater at the Panthers' one-yard line; on the ensuing play, Bridgewater was intercepted by Tashaun Gipson to set up a Bears touchdown. In Week 13 against the Detroit Lions, Nichols recorded a sack on Matthew Stafford and his first career interception off a pass thrown by Stafford that he returned for seven yards during the 34–30 loss.  Nichols was the first Bears defensive tackle to intercept a pass since Tommie Harris in 2009.

Las Vegas Raiders
Nichols signed a two-year, $11 million contract with the Las Vegas Raiders on March 17, 2022.

References

External links
Chicago Bears bio
Delaware Fightin' Blue Hens bio

1996 births
Living people
American football defensive tackles
Chicago Bears players
Delaware Fightin' Blue Hens football players
People from Newark, Delaware
Players of American football from Delaware
Sportspeople from the Delaware Valley
Las Vegas Raiders players